Xu Caidong (27 March 1919 – 14 April 2016) was a Chinese metallurgist, politician, and academician of the Chinese Academy of Sciences (CAS).

Biography
Xu was born in Fengxin County, Jiangxi. He graduated from Tangshan Engineering College, Chiao Tung University in 1943. He went to France in 1946 and obtained a doctor's degree from École Nationale Supérieure d'Électrochimie et d'Électrométallurgie de Grenoble (ENSEEG) in 1949. After returning to China, he joined the faculty of the Guizhou University School of Engineering in the same year. He joined Jiusan Society in 1956. 

Xu's research was mainly focused on the physical chemistry of metallurgy. He operated the blast furnace in smelting mercury, the industrial synthesis of potassium permanganate by the electrolytical method, and the industrial synthesis of calcium-magnesium phosphate in the shaft furnace.

Xu was elected an academician of the Chinese Academy of Sciences in 1980. He became the vice-governor of Guizhou Province in 1983. He was elected as the executive vice chairman of the central committee of Jiusan Society in 1990. He was appointed as the president of Guizhou University in 1997 when Guizhou Agricultural College, the Guizhou Institute of Arts, and the Guizhou Agricultural Cadre-Training School were merged into Guizhou University.

Xu died on 14 April 2016 in Beijing, at the age of 97.

References

1919 births
2016 deaths
Chinese metallurgists
Chinese physical chemists
Academic staff of Guizhou University
Members of the Chinese Academy of Sciences
Members of the Jiusan Society
People from Yichun, Jiangxi
People's Republic of China politicians from Jiangxi
Scientists from Jiangxi
Southwest Jiaotong University alumni
Vice-governors of Guizhou